Electronic waste or e-waste describes discarded electrical or electronic devices. Used electronics which are destined for refurbishment, reuse, resale, salvage recycling through material recovery, or disposal are also considered e-waste. Informal processing of e-waste in developing countries can lead to adverse human health effects and environmental pollution.

Electronic scrap components, such as CPUs, contain potentially harmful materials such as lead, cadmium, beryllium, or brominated flame retardants. Recycling and disposal of e-waste may involve significant risk to the health of workers and their communities.

Definition 

E-waste or electronic waste is created when an electronic product is discarded after the end of its useful life. The rapid expansion of technology and the consumption driven society results in the creation of a very large amount of e-waste.

In the US, the United States Environmental Protection Agency (EPA) classifies waste into ten categories:

 Large household appliances, including cooling and freezing appliances
 Small household appliances
 IT equipment, including monitors
 Consumer electronics, including televisions
 Lamps and luminaires
 Toys
 Tools
 Medical devices
 Monitoring and control instruments and
 Automatic dispensers

These include used electronics which are destined for reuse, resale, salvage, recycling, or disposal as well as re-usables (working and repairable electronics) and secondary raw materials (copper, steel, plastic, or similar). The term "waste" is reserved for residue or material which is dumped by the buyer rather than recycled, including residue from reuse and recycling operations, because loads of surplus electronics are frequently commingled (good, recyclable, and non-recyclable). Several public policy advocates apply the term "e-waste" and "e-scrap" broadly to apply to all surplus electronics. Cathode ray tubes (CRTs) are considered one of the hardest types to recycle.

Using a different set of categories, the Partnership on Measuring ICT for Development defines e-waste in six categories: 
 Temperature exchange equipment (such as air conditioners, freezers)
 Screens, monitors (TVs, laptops)
 Lamps (LED lamps, for example)
 Large equipment (washing machines, electric stoves)
 Small equipment (microwaves, electric shavers) and
 Small IT and telecommunication equipment (such as mobile phones, printers)

Products in each category vary in longevity profile, impact, and collection methods, among other differences. Around 70% of toxic waste in landfills is electronic waste.

CRTs have a relatively high concentration of lead and phosphors (not to be confused with phosphorus), both of which are necessary for the display.  The United States Environmental Protection Agency (EPA) includes discarded CRT monitors in its category of "hazardous household waste" but considers CRTs that have been set aside for testing to be commodities if they are not discarded, speculatively accumulated, or left unprotected from weather and other damage. These CRT devices are often confused between the DLP Rear Projection TV, both of which have a different recycling process due to the materials of which they are composed.

The EU and its member states operate a system via the European Waste Catalogue (EWC) – a European Council Directive, which is interpreted into "member state law". In the UK, this is in the form of the List of Wastes Directive. However, the list (and EWC) gives a broad definition (EWC Code 16 02 13*) of what is hazardous electronic waste, requiring "waste operators" to employ the Hazardous Waste Regulations (Annex 1A, Annex 1B) for refined definition. Constituent materials in the waste also require assessment via the combination of Annex II and Annex III, again allowing operators to further determine whether waste is hazardous.

Debate continues over the distinction between "commodity" and "waste" electronics definitions. Some exporters are accused of deliberately leaving difficult-to-recycle, obsolete, or non-repairable equipment mixed in loads of working equipment (though this may also come through ignorance, or to avoid more costly treatment processes). Protectionists may broaden the definition of "waste" electronics in order to protect domestic markets from working secondary equipment.

The high value of the computer recycling subset of electronic waste (working and reusable laptops, desktops, and components like RAM) can help pay the cost of transportation for a larger number of worthless pieces than what can be achieved with display devices, which have less (or negative) scrap value. A 2011 report, "Ghana E-waste Country Assessment", found that of 215,000 tons of electronics imported to Ghana, 30% was brand new and 70% was used. Of the used product, the study concluded that 15% was not reused and was scrapped or discarded. This contrasts with published but uncredited claims that 80% of the imports into Ghana were being burned in primitive conditions.

Quantity 

E-waste is considered the "fastest-growing waste stream in the world" with 44.7 million tonnes generated in 2016- equivalent to 4500 Eiffel towers. In 2018, an estimated 50 million tonnes of e-waste was reported, thus the name 'tsunami of e-waste' given by the UN. Its value is at least $62.5 billion annually.

Rapid changes in technology, changes in media (tapes, software, MP3), falling prices, and planned obsolescence have resulted in a fast-growing surplus of electronic waste around the globe. Technical solutions are available, but in most cases, a legal framework, a collection, logistics, and other services need to be implemented before a technical solution can be applied.

Display units (CRT, LCD, LED monitors), processors (CPU, GPU, or APU chips), memory (DRAM or SRAM), and audio components have different useful lives.  Processors are most frequently out-dated (by software no longer being optimized) and are more likely to become "e-waste" while display units are most often replaced while working without repair attempts, due to changes in wealthy nation appetites for new display technology. This problem could potentially be solved with modular smartphones (such as the Phonebloks concept). These types of phones are more durable and have the technology to change certain parts of the phone making them more environmentally friendly. Being able to simply replace the part of the phone that is broken will reduce e-waste.
An estimated 50 million tons of e-waste are produced each year. The USA discards 30 million computers each year and 100 million phones are disposed of in Europe each year. The Environmental Protection Agency estimates that only 15–20% of e-waste is recycled, the rest of these electronics go directly into landfills and incinerators.

In 2006, the United Nations estimated the amount of worldwide electronic waste discarded each year to be 50 million metric tons. According to a report by UNEP titled, "Recycling – from e-waste to Resources," the amount of e-waste being produced – including mobile phones and computers – could rise by as much as 500 percent over the next decade in some countries, such as India.  The United States is the world leader in producing electronic waste, tossing away about 3 million tons each year. China already produces about 2.3 million tons (2010 estimate) domestically, second only to the United States. And, despite having banned e-waste imports, China remains a major e-waste dumping ground for developed countries.

Society today revolves around technology and by the constant need for the newest and most high-tech products we are contributing to a mass amount of e-waste. Since the invention of the iPhone, cell phones have become the top source of e-waste products . Electrical waste contains hazardous but also valuable and scarce materials. Up to 60 elements can be found in complex electronics. As of 2013, Apple has sold over 796 million iDevices (iPod, iPhone, iPad). Cell phone companies make cell phones that are not made to last so that the consumer will purchase new phones. Companies give these products such short lifespans because they know that the consumer will want a new product and will buy it if they make it. In the United States, an estimated 70% of heavy metals in landfills comes from discarded electronics.

While there is agreement that the number of discarded electronic devices is increasing, there is considerable disagreement about the relative risk (compared to automobile scrap, for example), and strong disagreement whether curtailing trade in used electronics will improve conditions, or make them worse.  According to an article in Motherboard, attempts to restrict the trade have driven reputable companies out of the supply chain, with unintended consequences.

E-waste data 2016 

In 2016, Asia was the territory that had  the most extensive volume of e-waste (18.2 Mt), accompanied by Europe (12.3 metric tons), America (11.3 metric tons), Africa (2.2 metric tons), and Oceania (0.7 metric tons). The smallest in terms of total e-waste made, Oceania was the largest generator of e-waste per capita (17.3 kg/inhabitant), with hardly 6% of e-waste cited to be gathered and recycled. Europe is the second broadest generator of e-waste per citizen, with an average of 16.6 kg/inhabitant; however, Europe bears the loftiest assemblage figure (35%). America generates 11.6 kg/inhabitant and solicits only 17% of the e-waste caused in the provinces, which is commensurate with the assortment count in Asia (15%). However, Asia generates fewer e-waste per citizen (4,2 kg/inhabitant). Africa generates only 1.9 kg/inhabitant, and limited information is available on its collection percentage. The record furnishes regional breakdowns for Africa, Americas, Asia, Europe, and Oceania. The phenomenon somewhat illustrates the modest number figure linked to the overall volume of e-waste made that  41 countries have administrator e-waste data. For 16 other countries, e-waste volumes were collected from exploration and evaluated. The outcome of a considerable bulk of the e-waste (34.1 Metric tons) is unidentified. In countries where there is no national E-waste constitution in the stand, e-waste is possible interpreted as an alternative or general waste. This is land-filled or recycled, along with alternative metal or plastic scraps. There is the colossal compromise that the toxins are not drawn want of accordingly, or they are chosen want of by an informal sector and converted without well safeguarding the laborers while venting the contaminations in e-waste. Although the e-waste claim is on the rise, a flourishing quantity of countries are embracing e-waste regulation. National e-waste governance orders enclose 66% of the world population, a rise from 44% that was reached in 2014

E-waste data 2019 

In 2019, an enormous volume of e-waste (53.6 Mt, with a 7.3 kg per capita average) was generated globally. This is projected to increase to 74 Mt by 2030. Asia still remains the largest contributor of a significant volume of electronic waste at 24.9 Mt, followed by the Americas (13.1 Mt), Europe (12 Mt), and Africa and Oceania at 2.9 Mt and 0.7 Mt, respectively. In per capita generation, Europe came first with 16.2 kg, and Oceania was second largest generator at 16.1 kg, and followed by the Americas. Africa is the least generator of e-waste per capita at 2.5 kg. Regarding the collection and recycling of these waste, the continent of Europe ranked first (42.5%), and Asia came second (11.7%). The Americas and Oceania are next (9.4% and 8.8% respectively), and Africa trails behind at 0.9%. Out of the 53.6 Metric tons generated e-waste globally, the formally documented collection and recycling was 9.3%, and the fate of 44.3% remains uncertain, with its whereabouts and impact to the environment varying across different regions of the world. However, the number of countries with national e-waste legislation, regulation or policy, have increased since 2014, from 61 to 78. A great proportion of undocumented commercial and domestic waste get mixed with other streams of waste like plastic and metal waste, implying that fractions which are easily recyclable might be recycled, under conditions considered to be inferior without depollution and recovery of all materials considered valuable.

E-waste data 2021 
In 2021, an estimated of 57.4 Mt of e-waste was generated globally. According to estimates in Europe, where the problem is best studied, 11 of 72 electronic items in an average household are no longer in use or broken. Annually per citizen, another 4 to 5 kg of unused electrical and electronic products are hoarded in Europe prior to being discarded. In 2021, less than 20 percent of the e-waste is collected and recycled.

E-waste data 2022 
In 2022, an increase of 3.4% was estimated of the generated e-waste globally, hitting 59.4Mt, which made the total unrecycled e-waste on earth to 2022 is over 347 Mt.   The transboundary flow of e-waste has gained attention from the public due to a number of worrisome headlines, but global study on the volumes and trading routes has not yet been conducted. According to the Transboundary E-waste Flows Monitor, 5.1 Mt (or slightly under 10% of the 53.6 Mt of global e-waste) crossed international boundaries in 2019. This study divides transboundary movement of e-waste into regulated and uncontrolled movements and takes into account both the receiving and sending regions in order to better comprehend the implications of such movement. Of the 5.1 Mt, 1.8 Mt of the transboundary movement is sent under regulated conditions, while 3.3 Mt of the transboundary movement is delivered under uncontrolled conditions because used EEE or e-waste may encourage unlawful movements and provide a risk to the proper management of e-waste.

E-waste legislative frameworks 
The European Union (EU) has addressed the issue of electronic Waste by introducing two pieces of legislation. The first, the Waste Electrical and Electronic Equipment Directive (WEEE Directive) came into force in 2003.  The main aim of this directive was to regulate and motivate electronic waste recycling and re-use in member states at that moment. It was revised in 2008, coming into force in 2014. Furthermore, the EU has also implemented the Directive on the restriction of the use of certain hazardous substances in electrical and electronica equipment from 2003. This documents was additionally revised in 2012. When it comes to Western Balkan countries, North Macedonia has adopted a Law on Batteries and Accumulators in 2010, followed by the Law on Management of electrical and electronic equipment in 2012. Serbia has regulated management of special waste stream, including electronic waste, by National waste management strategy (2010–2019). Montenegro has adopted Concessionary Act concerning electronic waste with ambition to collect 4 kg of this waste annually per person until 2020.  Albanian legal framework is based on the draft act on waste from electrical and electronic equipment from 2011 which focuses on the design of electrical and electronic equipment. Contrary to this, Bosnia and Herzegovina is still missing a law regulating electronic waste.

As of October 2019, 78 countries globally have established either a policy, legislation or specific regulation to govern e-waste. However, there is no clear indication that countries are following the regulations. Regions such as Asia and Africa are having policies that are not legally binding and rather only programmatic ones. Hence, this poses as a challenge that e-waste management policies are yet not fully developed by globally by countries.

Solving the e-waste Problem (StEP) initiative 

Solving the E-waste Problem is a membership organization that is part of United Nations University and was created to develop solutions to address issues associated with electronic waste. Some of the most eminent players in the fields of Production, Reuse and Recycling of Electrical and Electronic Equipment (EEE), government agencies and NGOs as well as UN Organisations count themselves among its members. StEP encourages the collaboration of all stakeholders connected with e-waste, emphasizing a holistic, scientific yet applicable approach to the problem.:

Waste electrical and electronic equipment 
The European Commission (EC) of the EU has classified waste electrical and electronic equipment (WEEE) as the waste generated from electrical devices and household appliances like refrigerators, televisions, and mobile phones and other devices. In 2005 the EU reported total waste of 9 million tonnes and in 2020 estimates waste of 12 million tonnes. This electronic waste with hazardous materials if not managed properly, may end up badly affecting our environment and causing fatal health issues. Disposing of these materials requires a lot of manpower and properly managed facilities. Not only the disposal, manufacturing of these types of materials require huge facilities and natural resources (aluminum, gold, copper and silicon, etc.), ending up damaging our environment and pollution. Considering the impact of WEEE materials make on our environment, EU legislation has made two legislations: 1. WEEE Directive; 2. RoHS Directive: Directive on usage and restrictions of hazardous materials in producing these Electrical and Electronic Equipment.

WEEE Directive: This Directive was implemented in February 2003, focusing on recycling electronic waste. This Directive offered many electronic waste collection schemes free of charge to the consumers (Directive 2002/96/EC ). The EC revised this Directive in December 2008, since this has become the fastest growing waste stream. In August 2012, the WEEE Directive was rolled out to handle the situation of controlling electronic waste and this was implemented on 14 February 2014 (Directive 2012/19/EU ). On 18 April 2017, the EC adopted a common principle of carrying out research and implementing a new regulation to monitor the amount of WEEE. It requires each member state to monitor and report their national market data.
-	Annex III to the WEEE Directive (Directive 2012/19/EU): Re-examination of the timelines for waste collection and setting up individual targets (Report ).

WEEE Legislation:
-	On 4 July 2012, the EC passed legislation on WEEE (Directive 2012/19/EU ). To know more about the progress in adopting the Directive 2012/19/EU (Progress ).
-	On 15 February 2014, the EC revised the Directive. To know more about the old Directive 2002/96/EC, see (Report ).

RoHS Directive: In 2003, the EC not only implemented legislation on waste collection but also on the alternative use of hazardous materials (Cadmium, mercury, flammable materials, polybrominated biphenyls, lead and polybrominated diphenyl ethers) used in the production of electronic and electric equipment (RoHS Directive 2002/95/EC ). This Directive was again revised in December 2008 and later again in January 2013 (RoHS recast Directive 2011/65/EU ). In 2017, the EC has made adjustment to the existing Directive considering the impact assessment  and adopted to a new legislative proposal  (RoHS 2 scope review ). On 21 November 2017, the European Parliament and Council has published this legislation amending the RoHS 2 Directive in their official journal .

European Commission legislation on batteries and accumulators (Batteries Directive) 
Each year, the EU reports nearly 800 000 tons of batteries from automotive industry, industrial batteries of around 190 000 tons and consumer batteries around 160 000 tons entering the Europe region. These batteries are one of the most commonly used products in household appliances and other battery powered products in our day-to-day life. The important issue to look into is how this battery waste is collected and recycled properly, which has the consequences of resulting in hazardous materials release into the environment and water resources. Generally, many parts of these batteries and accumulators / capacitors can be recycled without releasing these hazardous materials release into our environment and contaminating our natural resources. The EC has rolled out a new Directive to control the waste from the batteries and accumulators known as 'Batteries Directive' aiming to improve the collecting and recycling process of the battery waste and control the impact of battery waste on our environment. This Directive also supervises and administers the internal market by implementing required measures.
This Directive restricts the production and marketing of batteries and accumulators which contains hazardous materials and are harmful to the environment, difficult to collect and recycle them. Batteries Directive  targets on the collection, recycling and other recycling activities of batteries and accumulators, also approving labels to the batteries which are environment neutral. On 10 December 2020, The EC has proposed a new regulation (Batteries Regulation ) on the batteries waste which aims to make sure that batteries entering the European market are recyclable, sustainable and non-hazardous (Press release ).

Legislation:
In 2006, the EC has adopted the Batteries Directive and revised it in 2013.
-	On 6 September 2006, the European Parliament and European Council have launched Directives in waste from Batteries and accumulators (Directive 2006/66/EC ).
-	Overview of Batteries and accumulators Legislation 

Evaluation of Directive 2006/66/EC (Batteries Directive):
Revising Directives could be based on the Evaluation  process, considering the fact of the increase in the usage of batteries with an increase in the multiple communication technologies, household appliances and other small battery-powered products. The increase in the demand of renewable energies and recycling of the products has also led to an initiative 'European Batteries Alliance (EBA)' which aims to supervise the complete value chain of production of more improved batteries and accumulators within Europe under this new policy act. Though the adoption of the Evaluation  process has been broadly accepted, few concerns rose particularly managing and monitoring the use of hazardous materials in the production of batteries, collection of the battery waste, recycling of the battery waste within the Directives. The evaluation process has definitely gave good results in the areas like controlling the environmental damage, increasing the awareness of recycling, reusable batteries and also improving the efficiency of the internal markets.

However, there are few limitations in the implementations of the Batteries Directive in the process of collecting batteries waste and recovering the usable materials from them. The evaluation process throws some light on the gap in this process of implementation and collaborate technical aspects in the process and new ways to use makes it more difficult to implement and this Directive maintains the balance with technological advancements. The EC's regulations and guidelines has made the evaluation process more impactful in a positive way. The participation of number of stakeholders in the evaluation process who are invited and asked to provide their views and ideas to improve the process of evaluation and information gathering. On 14 March 2018, stakeholders and members of the association participated to provide information about their findings, support and increase the process of Evaluation Roadmap .

European Union directives on e-waste 
The European Union (EU) has addressed the e-waste issue by adopting several directives. In 2011 an amendment was made to a 2003 Directive 2002/95/EC regarding restriction of the use of hazardous materials in the planning and manufacturing process in the EEE. In the 2011 Directive, 2011/65/EU it was stated as the motivation for more specific restriction on the usage of hazardous materials in the planning and manufacturing process of electronic and electrical devices as there was a disparity of the EU Member State laws and the need arose to set forth rules to protect human health and for the environmentally sound recovery and disposal of WEEE. (2011/65/EU, (2)) The Directive lists several substances subject to restriction. The Directive states restricted substances for maximum concentration values tolerated by weight in homogeneous materials are the following: lead (0.1%); mercury (0.1%), cadmium (0.1%), hexavalent chromium (0.1%), polybrominated biphenyls (PBB) (0.1%) and polybrominated diphenyl ethers (PBDE) (0.1 %). If technologically feasible and substitution is available, the usage of substitution is required.

There are, however, exemptions in the case in which substitution is not possible from the scientific and technical point of view. The allowance and duration of the substitutions should take into account the availability of the substitute and the socioeconomic impact of the substitute. (2011/65/EU, (18))

EU Directive 2012/19/EU regulates WEEE and lays down measures to safeguard the ecosystem and human health by inhibiting or shortening the impact of the generation and management of waste of WEEE. (2012/19/EU, (1)) The Directive takes a specific approach to the product design of EEE. It states in Article 4 that Member States are under the constraint to expedite the kind of model and manufacturing process as well as cooperation between producers and recyclers as to facilitate re-use, dismantling and recovery of WEEE, its components, and materials. (2012/19/EU, (4)) The Member States should create measures to make sure the producers of EEE use eco-design, meaning that the type of manufacturing process is used that would not restrict later re-use of WEEE. The Directive also gives Member States the obligation to ensure a separate collection and transportation of different WEEE. Article 8 lays out the requirements of the proper treatment of WEEE. The base minimum of proper treatment that is required for every WEEE is the removal of all liquids. The recovery targets set are seen in the following figures.

Under Annex I of Directive 2012/19/EU, the categories of EEE covered are as follows:

 Large household appliances
 Small household appliances
 IT and telecommunications equipment
 Consumer equipment and photovoltaic panels
 Lighting equipment
 Electrical and electronic tools (with the exception of large-scale stationary industrial tools)
 Toys, leisure and sports equipment
 Medical devices (with the exception of all implanted and infected products)
 Monitoring and control instruments
 Autonomic dispensers

Minimum recovery targets referred in Directive 2012/19/EU starting from 15 August 2018:

WEEE falling within category 1 or 10 of Annex I

- 85% shall be recovered, and 80% shall be prepared for re-use and recycled;

WEEE falling within category 3 or 4 of Annex I

- 80% shall be recovered, and 70% shall be prepared for re-use and recycled;

WEEE falling  within category 2, 5, 6, 7, 8 or 9 of Annex I

-75% shall be recovered, and 55% shall be prepared for re-use and recycled;

For gas and discharged lamps, 80% shall be recycled.

In 2021, the European Commission proposed the implementation of a standardization – for iterations of USB-C – of phone charger products after commissioning two impact assessment studies and a technology analysis study. Regulations like this may reduce electronic waste by small but significant amounts as well as, in this case, increase device-interoperability, convergence and convenience for consumers while decreasing resource-needs and redundancy. The regulations were passed in June 2022, mandating that all phones sold in the EU to have USB-C charging ports by late 2024.

International agreements 

A report by the United Nations Environment Management Group lists key processes and agreements made by various organizations globally in an effort to manage and control e-waste. Details about the policies could be retrieved in the links below.

 International Convention for the Prevention of Pollution from Ships (MARPOL) (73/78/97)
 Basel Convention on the Control of Transboundary Movements of Hazardous Wastes and their Disposal (1989)
 Montreal Protocol on Ozone Depleting Substances (1989)
 International Labour Organization (ILO) Convention on Chemicals, concerning safety in the use of chemicals at work (1990)
 Organisation for Economic Cooperation and Development (OECD), Council Decision Waste Agreement (1992)
 United Nations Framework Convention on Climate Change (UNFCCC) (1994)
 International Conference on Chemicals Management (ICCM) (1995)
 Rotterdam Convention on the Prior Informed Consent Procedure for Certain Hazardous Chemicals and Pesticides in International Trade (1998)
 Stockholm Convention on Persistent Organic Pollutants (2001)
 World Health Organisation (WHO), World Health Assembly Resolutions (2006–2016)
 Hong Kong International Convention for the Safe and Environmentally Sound Recycling of Ships (2009) 
 Minamata Convention on Mercury (2013)
 Paris Climate Agreement (2015) under the United Nations Framework Convention on Climate Change
 Connect 2020 Agenda for Global Telecommunication/ICT Development (2014)

Global trade issues 

One theory is that increased regulation of electronic wastes and concern over the environmental harm in nature economies creates an economic disincentive to remove residues prior to export.  Critics of trade in used electronics maintain that it is still too easy for brokers calling themselves recyclers to export unscreened electronic waste to developing countries, such as China, India and parts of Africa, thus avoiding the expense of removing items like bad cathode ray tubes (the processing of which is expensive and difficult). The developing countries have become toxic dump yards of e-waste. Developing countries receiving foreign e-waste often go further to repair and recycle forsaken equipment. Yet still 90% of e-waste ended up in landfills in developing countries in 2003.  Proponents of international trade point to the success of fair trade programs in other industries, where cooperation has led to creation of sustainable jobs and can bring affordable technology in countries where repair and reuse rates are higher.

Defenders of the trade in used electronics say that extraction of metals from virgin mining has been shifted to developing countries.  Recycling of copper, silver, gold, and other materials from discarded electronic devices is considered better for the environment than mining. They also state that repair and reuse of computers and televisions has become a "lost art" in wealthier nations and that refurbishing has traditionally been a path to development.

South Korea, Taiwan, and southern China all excelled in finding "retained value" in used goods, and in some cases have set up billion-dollar industries in refurbishing used ink cartridges, single-use cameras, and working CRTs. Refurbishing has traditionally been a threat to established manufacturing, and simple protectionism explains some criticism of the trade. Works like "The Waste Makers" by Vance Packard explain some of the criticism of exports of working product, for example, the ban on import of tested working Pentium 4 laptops to China, or the bans on export of used surplus working electronics by Japan.

Opponents of surplus electronics exports argue that lower environmental and labor standards, cheap labor, and the relatively high value of recovered raw materials lead to a transfer of pollution-generating activities, such as smelting of copper wire. Electronic waste is often sent to various African and Asian countries such as China, Malaysia, India, and Kenya for processing, sometimes illegally. Many surplus laptops are routed to developing nations as "dumping grounds for e-waste".

Because the United States has not ratified the Basel Convention or its Ban Amendment, and has few domestic federal laws forbidding the export of toxic waste, the Basel Action Network estimates that about 80% of the electronic waste directed to recycling in the U.S. does not get recycled there at all, but is put on container ships and sent to countries such as China. This figure is disputed as an exaggeration by the EPA, the Institute of Scrap Recycling Industries, and the World Reuse, Repair and Recycling Association.

Independent research by Arizona State University showed that 87–88% of imported used computers did not have a higher value than the best value of the constituent materials they contained, and that "the official trade in end-of-life computers is thus driven by reuse as opposed to recycling".

Trade 

Proponents of the trade say growth of internet access is a stronger correlation to trade than poverty. Haiti is poor and closer to the port of New York than southeast Asia, but far more electronic waste is exported from New York to Asia than to Haiti. Thousands of men, women, and children are employed in reuse, refurbishing, repair, and re-manufacturing, unsustainable industries in decline in developed countries.  Denying developing nations access to used electronics may deny them sustainable employment, affordable products, and internet access, or force them to deal with even less scrupulous suppliers.  In a series of seven articles for The Atlantic, Shanghai-based reporter Adam Minter describes many of these computer repair and scrap separation activities as objectively sustainable.

Opponents of the trade argue that developing countries utilize methods that are more harmful and more wasteful. An expedient and prevalent method is simply to toss equipment onto an open fire, in order to melt plastics and to burn away non-valuable metals. This releases carcinogens and neurotoxins into the air, contributing to an acrid, lingering smog. These noxious fumes include dioxins and furans. Bonfire refuse can be disposed of quickly into drainage ditches or waterways feeding the ocean or local water supplies.

In June 2008, a container of electronic waste, destined from the Port of Oakland in the U.S. to Sanshui District in mainland China, was intercepted in Hong Kong by Greenpeace. Concern over exports of electronic waste were raised in press reports in India, Ghana, Côte d'Ivoire, and Nigeria.

The research that was undertaken by the Countering WEEE Illegal Trade (CWIT) project, funded by the European Commission, found that in Europe only 35% (3.3 million tons) of all the e-waste discarded in 2012 ended up in the officially reported amounts of collection and recycling systems.
The other 65% (6.15 million tons) was either:
 Exported (1.5 million tons),
 Recycled under non-compliant conditions in Europe (3.15 million tons),
 Scavenged for valuable parts (750,000 tons), or
 Simply thrown in waste bins (750,000 tons).

Guiyu 

Guiyu in the Guangdong region of China is a massive electronic waste processing community. It is often referred to as the "e-waste capital of the world." Traditionally, Guiyu was an agricultural community; however, in the mid-1990s it transformed into an e-waste recycling center involving over 75% of the local households and an additional 100,000 migrant workers. Thousands of individual workshops employ laborers to snip cables, pry chips from circuit boards, grind plastic computer cases into particles, and dip circuit boards in acid baths to dissolve the precious metals. Others work to strip insulation from all wiring in an attempt to salvage tiny amounts of copper wire. Uncontrolled burning, disassembly, and disposal has led to a number of environmental problems such as groundwater contamination, atmospheric pollution, and water pollution either by immediate discharge or from surface runoff (especially near coastal areas), as well as health problems including occupational safety and health effects among those directly and indirectly involved, due to the methods of processing the waste.

Six of the many villages in Guiyu specialize in circuit-board disassembly, seven in plastics and metals reprocessing, and two in wire and cable disassembly. Greenpeace, an environmental group, sampled dust, soil, river sediment, and groundwater in Guiyu. They found very high levels of toxic heavy metals and organic contaminants in both places. Lai Yun, a campaigner for the group found "over 10 poisonous metals, such as lead, mercury, and cadmium."

Guiyu is only one example of digital dumps but similar places can be found across the world in Nigeria, Ghana, and India.

Other informal e-waste recycling sites 

Guiyu is likely one of the oldest and largest informal e-waste recycling sites in the world; however, there are many sites worldwide, including India, Ghana (Agbogbloshie), Nigeria, and the Philippines. There are a handful of studies that describe exposure levels in e-waste workers, the community, and the environment. For example, locals and migrant workers in Delhi, a northern union territory of India, scavenge discarded computer equipment and extract base metals using toxic, unsafe methods. Bangalore, located in southern India, is often referred as the "Silicon Valley of India" and has a growing informal e-waste recycling sector. A study found that e-waste workers in the slum community had higher levels of V, Cr, Mn, Mo, Sn, Tl, and Pb than workers at an e-waste recycling facility.

Cryptocurrency e-waste 

Bitcoin mining has also contributed to higher amounts in electronic waste. Bitcoin and other cryptocurrencies can be used for payment or speculation. Per de Vries & Stoll in the journal Resources, Conservation and Recycling the average bitcoin transaction yields 272 grams of electronic waste and generated approximately 112.5 million grams of waste in 2020 alone. Other estimates indicate that the bitcoin network discards as much "small IT and telecommunication equipment waste produced by a country like the Netherlands," totalling to 30.7 metric kilotons every year. Furthermore, the rate at which Bitcoin disposes of its waste exceeds that of major financial organizations such as VISA, which produces 40 grams of waste for every 100,000 transactions.

A major point of concern is the rapid turnover of technology in the bitcoin industry which results in such high levels of e-waste. This can be attributed to the proof-of-work principle bitcoin employs where miners receive currency as a reward for being the first to decode the hashes that encode its blockchain. As such, miners are encouraged to compete with one another to decode the hash first. However, computing these hashes requires massive computing power which, in effect, drives miners to obtain rigs with the highest processing power possible. In an attempt to achieve this, miners increase the processing power in their rigs by purchasing more advanced computer chips.

According to Koomey's Law, efficiency in computer chips doubles every 1.5 years, meaning that miners are incentivized to purchase new chips to keep up with competing miners even though the older chips are still functional. In some cases, miners even discard their chips earlier than this timeframe for the sake of profitability. However, this leads to a significant build up in waste, as outdated application-specific integrated circuits (ASIC computer chips) cannot be reused or repurposed. Most computer chips used to mine bitcoin are ASIC chips, whose sole function is to mine bitcoin, rendering them useless for other cryptocurrencies or operation in any other piece of technology. Therefore, outdated ASIC chips can only be disposed of since they are unable to be repurposed.

The bitcoin e-waste problem is further exacerbated by the fact that many countries and corporations lack recycling programs for ASIC chips. Developing a recycling infrastructure for bitcoin mining may prove to be beneficial, though, as the aluminum heat sinks and metal casings in ASIC chips can be recycled into new technology. Much of this responsibility falls onto Bitmain, the leading manufacturer of bitcoin, which currently lacks the infrastructure to recycle waste from bitcoin mining. Without such programs, much of bitcoin waste ends up in landfill along with 83.6% of the global total of e-waste.

Many argue for relinquishing the proof-of-work model altogether in favour of the proof-of-stake one. This model selects one miner to validate the transactions in the blockchain, rather than have all miners competing for it. With no competition, the processing speed of miners' rigs would not matter. Any device could be used for validating the blockchain, so there would be no incentive to use single-use ASIC chips or continually purchase new and dispose of old ones.

Environmental impact 

A recent study about the rising electronic pollution in the USA revealed that the average computer screen has five to eight pounds or more of lead representing 40 percent of all the lead in US landfills. All these toxins are persistent, bioaccumulative toxins (PBTs) that create environmental and health risks when computers are incinerated, put in landfills or melted down. The emission of fumes, gases, and particulate matter into the air, the discharge of liquid waste into water and drainage systems, and the disposal of hazardous wastes contribute to environmental degradation. The processes of dismantling and disposing of electronic waste in developing countries led to a number of environmental impacts as illustrated in the graphic. Liquid and atmospheric releases end up in bodies of water, groundwater, soil, and air and therefore in land and sea animals – both domesticated and wild, in crops eaten by both animals and humans, and in drinking water.

One study of environmental effects in Guiyu, China found the following:
 Airborne dioxins – one type found at 100 times levels previously measured
 Levels of carcinogens in duck ponds and rice paddies exceeded international standards for agricultural areas and cadmium, copper, nickel, and lead levels in rice paddies were above international standards
 Heavy metals found in road dust – lead over 300 times that of a control village's road dust and copper over 100 times

The Agbogbloshie area of Ghana, where about 40,000 people live, provides an example of how e-waste contamination can pervade the daily lives of nearly all residents. Into this area—one of the largest informal e-waste dumping and processing sites in Africa—about 215,000 tons of secondhand consumer electronics, primarily from Western Europe, are imported annually. Because this region has considerable overlap among industrial, commercial, and residential zones, Pure Earth (formerly Blacksmith Institute) has ranked Agbogbloshie as one of the world's 10 worst toxic threats (Blacksmith Institute 2013).

A separate study at the Agbogbloshie e-waste dump, Ghana found a presence of lead levels as high as 18,125 ppm in the soil. US EPA standard for lead in soil in play areas is 400 ppm and 1200 ppm for non-play areas. Scrap workers at the Agbogbloshie e-waste dump regularly burn electronic components and auto harness wires for copper recovery, releasing toxic chemicals like lead, dioxins and furans into the environment.

Researchers such as Brett Robinson, a professor of soil and physical sciences at Lincoln University in New Zealand, warn that wind patterns in Southeast China disperse toxic particles released by open-air burning across the Pearl River Delta Region, home to 45 million people. In this way, toxic chemicals from e-waste enter the "soil-crop-food pathway," one of the most significant routes for heavy metals' exposure to humans. These chemicals are not biodegradable— they persist in the environment for long periods of time, increasing exposure risk.

In the agricultural district of Chachoengsao, in the east of Bangkok, local villagers had lost their main water source as a result of e-waste dumping. The cassava fields were transformed in late 2017, when a nearby Chinese-run factory started bringing in foreign e-waste items such as crushed computers, circuit boards and cables for recycling to mine the electronics for valuable metal components like copper, silver and gold. But the items also contain lead, cadmium and mercury, which are highly toxic if mishandled during processing. Apart from feeling faint from noxious fumes emitted during processing, a local claimed the factory has also contaminated her water. "When it was raining, the water went through the pile of waste and passed our house and went into the soil and water system. Water tests conducted in the province by environmental group Earth and the local government both found toxic levels of iron, manganese, lead, nickel and in some cases arsenic and cadmium. "The communities observed when they used water from the shallow well, there was some development of skin disease or there are foul smells," founder of Earth, Penchom Saetang said. "This is proof, that it is true, as the communities suspected, there are problems happening to their water sources."

Depending on the age and type of the discarded item, the chemical composition of e-waste may vary. Most e-waste are composed of a mixture of metals like Cu, Al and Fe. They might be attached to, covered with or even mixed with various types of plastics and ceramics. E-waste has a horrible effect on the environment and it is important to dispose it with an R2 certifies recycling facility.

Research 
In May 2020, a scientific study was conducted in China that investigated the occurrence and distribution of traditional and novel classes of contaminants, including chlorinated, brominated, and mixed halogenated dibenzo-p-dioxins/dibenzofurans (PCDD/Fs, PBDD/Fs, PXDD/Fs), polybrominated diphenyl ethers (PBDEs), polychlorinated biphenyls (PCBs) and polyhalogenated carbazoles (PHCZs) in soil from an e-waste disposal site in Hangzhou (which has been in operation since 2009 and has a treatment capacity of 19.6 Wt/a). While the study area has only one formal emission source, the broader industrial zone has a number of metal recovery and reprocessing plants as well as heavy traffic on adjacent motorways where normal and heavy-duty devices are used. The maximum concentrations of the target halogenated organic compounds HOCs were 0.1–1.5 km away from the main source and overall detected levels of HOCs were generally lower than those reported globally. The study proved what researchers have warned, i. e. on highways with heavy traffic, especially those serving diesel powered vehicles, exhaust emissions are larger sources of dioxins than stationary sources. When assessing the environmental and health impacts of chemical compounds, especially PBDD/Fs and PXDD/Fs, the compositional complexity of soil and long period weather conditions like rain and downwind have to be taken into account. Further investigations are necessary to build up a common understanding and methods for assessing e-waste impacts.

Information security 
Discarded data processing equipment may still contain readable data that may be considered sensitive to the previous users of the device. A recycling plan for such equipment can support information security by ensuring proper steps are followed to erase the sensitive information.  This may include such steps as re-formatting of storage media and overwriting with random data to make data unrecoverable, or even physical destruction of media by shredding and incineration to ensure all data is obliterated. For example, on many operating systems deleting a file may still leave the physical data file intact on the media, allowing data retrieval by routine methods.

Recycling 

Recycling is an essential element of e-waste management. Properly carried out, it should greatly reduce the leakage of toxic materials into the environment and militate against the exhaustion of natural resources. However, it does need to be encouraged by local authorities and through community education. Less than 20% of e-waste is formally recycled, with 80% either ending up in landfill or being informally recycled – much of it by hand in developing countries, exposing workers to hazardous and carcinogenic substances such as mercury, lead and cadmium.

One of the major challenges is recycling the printed circuit boards from electronic waste. The circuit boards contain such precious metals as gold, silver, platinum, etc. and such base metals as copper, iron, aluminum, etc.  One way e-waste is processed is by melting circuit boards, burning cable sheathing to recover copper wire and open- pit acid leaching for separating metals of value. Conventional method employed is mechanical shredding and separation but the recycling efficiency is low. Alternative methods such as cryogenic decomposition have been studied for printed circuit board recycling, and some other methods are still under investigation. Properly disposing of or reusing electronics can help prevent health problems, reduce greenhouse-gas emissions, and create jobs.

Consumer awareness efforts 

The U.S. Environmental Protection Agency encourages electronic recyclers to become certified by demonstrating to an accredited, independent third party auditor that they meet specific standards to safely recycle and manage electronics.  This should work so as to ensure the highest environmental standards are being maintained.  Two certifications for electronic recyclers currently exist and are endorsed by the EPA.  Customers are encouraged to choose certified electronics recyclers.  Responsible electronics recycling reduces environmental and human health impacts, increases the use of reusable and refurbished equipment and reduces energy use while conserving limited resources. The two EPA-endorsed certification programs are Responsible Recyclers Practices (R2) and E-Stewards.  Certified companies ensure they are meeting strict environmental standards which maximize reuse and recycling, minimize exposure to human health or the environment, ensure safe management of materials and require destruction of all data used on electronics. Certified electronics recyclers have demonstrated through audits and other means that they continually meet specific high environmental standards and safely manage used electronics. Once certified, the recycler is held to the particular standard by continual oversight by the independent accredited certifying body. A certification board accredits and oversees certifying bodies to ensure that they meet specific responsibilities and are competent to audit and provide certification.

Some U.S. retailers offer opportunities for consumer recycling of discarded electronic devices. In the US, the Consumer Electronics Association (CEA) urges consumers to dispose properly of end-of-life electronics through its recycling locator. This list only includes manufacturer and retailer programs that use the strictest standards and third-party certified recycling locations, to provide consumers assurance that their products will be recycled safely and responsibly. CEA research has found that 58 percent of consumers know where to take their end-of-life electronics, and the electronics industry would very much like to see that level of awareness increase. Consumer electronics manufacturers and retailers sponsor or operate more than 5,000 recycling locations nationwide and have vowed to recycle one billion pounds annually by 2016, a sharp increase from 300 million pounds industry recycled in 2010.

The Sustainable Materials Management (SMM) Electronic Challenge was created by the United States Environmental Protection Agency (EPA) in 2012.  Participants of the Challenge are manufacturers of electronics and electronic retailers. These companies collect end-of-life (EOL) electronics at various locations and send them to a certified, third-party recycler. Program participants are then able publicly promote and report 100% responsible recycling for their companies. The Electronics TakeBack Coalition (ETBC) is a campaign aimed at protecting human health and limiting environmental effects where electronics are being produced, used, and discarded. The ETBC aims to place responsibility for disposal of technology products on electronic manufacturers and brand owners, primarily through community promotions and legal enforcement initiatives. It provides recommendations for consumer recycling and a list of recyclers judged environmentally responsible. While there have been major benefits from the rise in recycling and waste collection created by producers and consumers, such as valuable materials being recovered and kept away from landfill and incineration, there are still many problems present with the EPR system including "how to ensure proper enforcement of recycling standards, what to do about waste with positive net value, and the role of competition," (Kunz et al.).  Many stakeholders agreed there needs to be a higher standard of accountability and efficiency to improve the systems of recycling everywhere, as well as the growing amount of waste being an opportunity more so than downfall since it gives us more chances to create an efficient system. To make recycling competition more cost-effective, the producers agreed that there needs to be a higher drive for competition because it allows them to have a wider range of producer responsibility organizations to choose from for e-waste recycling.

The Certified Electronics Recycler program for electronic recyclers is a comprehensive, integrated management system standard that incorporates key operational and continual improvement elements for quality, environmental and health and safety performance. The grassroots Silicon Valley Toxics Coalition promotes human health and addresses environmental justice problems resulting from toxins in technologies. The World Reuse, Repair, and Recycling Association (wr3a.org) is an organization dedicated to improving the quality of exported electronics, encouraging better recycling standards in importing countries, and improving practices through "Fair Trade" principles. Take Back My TV is a project of The Electronics TakeBack Coalition and grades television manufacturers to find out which are responsible, in the coalition's view, and which are not.

There have also been efforts to raise awareness of the potentially hazardous conditions of the dismantling of e-waste in American prisons. The Silicon Valley Toxics Coalition, prisoner-rights activists, and environmental groups released a Toxic Sweatshops report that details how prison labor is being used to handle e-waste, resulting in health consequences among the workers. These groups allege that, since prisons do not have adequate safety standards, inmates are dismantling the products under unhealthy and unsafe conditions.

Processing techniques 

In many developed countries, electronic waste processing usually first involves dismantling the equipment into various parts (metal frames, power supplies, circuit boards, plastics), often by hand, but increasingly by automated shredding equipment. A typical example is the NADIN electronic waste processing plant in Novi Iskar, Bulgaria—the largest facility of its kind in Eastern Europe. The advantages of this process are the human worker's ability to recognize and save working and repairable parts, including chips, transistors, RAM, etc. The disadvantage is that the labor is cheapest in countries with the lowest health and safety standards.

In an alternative bulk system, a hopper conveys material for shredding into an unsophisticated mechanical separator, with screening and granulating machines to separate constituent metal and plastic fractions, which are sold to smelters or plastics recyclers. Such recycling machinery is enclosed and employs a dust collection system. Some of the emissions are caught by scrubbers and screens. Magnets, eddy currents, and Trommel screens are employed to separate glass, plastic, and ferrous and nonferrous metals, which can then be further separated at a smelter.

Copper, gold, palladium, silver and tin are valuable metals sold to smelters for recycling. Hazardous smoke and gases are captured, contained and treated to mitigate environmental threat. These methods allow for safe reclamation of all valuable computer construction materials. Hewlett-Packard product recycling solutions manager Renee St. Denis describes its process as: "We move them through giant shredders about 30 feet tall and it shreds everything into pieces about the size of a quarter. Once your disk drive is shredded into pieces about this big, it's hard to get the data off". An ideal electronic waste recycling plant combines dismantling for component recovery with increased cost-effective processing of bulk electronic waste. Reuse is an alternative option to recycling because it extends the lifespan of a device. Devices still need eventual recycling, but by allowing others to purchase used electronics, recycling can be postponed and value gained from device use.

In early November 2021, the U.S. state of Georgia announced a joint effort with Igneo Technologies to build an $85 million large electronics recycling plant in the Port of Savannah. The project will focus on lower-value, plastics-heavy devices in the waste stream using multiple shredders and furnaces using pyrolysis technology.

Benefits of recycling 
Recycling raw materials from end-of-life electronics is the most effective solution to the growing e-waste problem. Most electronic devices contain a variety of materials, including metals that can be recovered for future uses. By dismantling and providing reuse possibilities, intact natural resources are conserved and air and water pollution caused by hazardous disposal is avoided. Additionally, recycling reduces the amount of greenhouse gas emissions caused by the manufacturing of new products. Another benefit of recycling e-waste is that many of the materials can be recycled and re-used again. Materials that can be recycled include "ferrous (iron-based) and non-ferrous metals, glass, and various types of plastic." "Non-ferrous metals, mainly aluminum and copper can all be re-smelted and re-manufactured. Ferrous metals such as steel and iron also can be re-used." Due to the recent surge in popularity in 3D printing, certain 3D printers have been designed (FDM variety) to produce waste that can be easily recycled which decreases the amount of harmful pollutants in the atmosphere. The excess plastic from these printers that comes out as a byproduct can also be reused to create new 3D printed creations.

Benefits of recycling are extended when responsible recycling methods are used. In the U.S., responsible recycling aims to minimize the dangers to human health and the environment that disposed and dismantled electronics can create. Responsible recycling ensures best management practices of the electronics being recycled, worker health and safety, and consideration for the environment locally and abroad. In Europe, metals that are recycled are returned to companies of origin at a reduced cost. Through a committed recycling system, manufacturers in Japan have been pushed to make their products more sustainable. Since many companies were responsible for the recycling of their own products, this imposed responsibility on manufacturers requiring many to redesign their infrastructure. As a result, manufacturers in Japan have the added option to sell the recycled metals.

Improper management of e-waste is resulting in a significant loss of scarce and valuable raw materials, such as gold, platinum, cobalt and rare earth elements. As much as 7% of the world's gold may currently be contained in e-waste, with 100 times more gold in a tonne of e-waste than in a tonne of gold ore.

Repair as waste reduction method 
There are several ways to curb the environmental hazards arising from the recycling of electronic waste. One of the factors which exacerbate the e-waste problem is the diminishing lifetime of many electrical and electronic goods. There are two drivers (in particular) for this trend. On the one hand, consumer demand for low cost products militates against product quality and results in short product lifetimes. On the other, manufacturers in some sectors encourage a regular upgrade cycle, and may even enforce it though restricted availability of spare parts, service manuals and software updates, or through planned obsolescence.

Consumer dissatisfaction with this state of affairs has led to a growing repair movement. Often, this is at a community level such as through repair cafės or the "restart parties" promoted by the Restart Project.

The Right to Repair is spearheaded in the US by farmers dissatisfied with non-availability of service information, specialised tools and spare parts for their high-tech farm machinery. But the movement extends far beyond farm machinery with, for example, the restricted repair options offered by Apple coming in for criticism. Manufacturers often counter with safety concerns resulting from unauthorised repairs and modifications.

An easy method of reducing electronic waste footprint is to sell or donate electronic gadgets, rather than dispose of them.
Improperly disposed e-waste is becoming more and more hazardous, especially as the sheer volume of e-waste increases. For this reason, large brands like Apple, Samsung, and others have started giving options to customers to recycle old electronics. Recycling allows the expensive electronic parts inside to be reused. This may save significant energy and reduce the need for mining of additional raw resources, or manufacture of new components. Electronic recycling programs may be found locally in many areas with a simple online search; for example, by searching "recycle electronics" along with the city or area name.

Cloud services have proven to be useful in storing data, which is then accessible from anywhere in the world without the need to carry storage devices. Cloud storage also allows for large storage, at low cost. This offers convenience, while reducing the need for manufacture of new storage devices, thus curbing the amount of e-waste generated.

Electronic waste classification 
The market has a lot of different types of electrical products. To categorize these products, it is necessary to group them into sensible and practical categories. Classification of the products may even help to determine the process to be used for disposal of the product. Making the classifications, in general, is helping to describe e-waste. Classifications has not defined special details, for example when they do not pose a threat to the environment. On the other hand, classifications should not be too aggregated because of countries differences in interpretation. The UNU-KEYs system closely follows the harmonized statistical (HS) coding. It is an international nomenclature which is an integrated system to allow classify common basis for customs purposes.

Electronic waste substances 

Some computer components can be reused in assembling new computer products, while others are reduced to metals that can be reused in applications as varied as construction, flatware, and jewellery. Substances found in large quantities include epoxy resins, fiberglass, PCBs, PVC (polyvinyl chlorides), thermosetting plastics, lead, tin, copper, silicon, beryllium, carbon, iron, and aluminum. Elements found in small amounts include cadmium, mercury, and thallium. Elements found in trace amounts include americium, antimony, arsenic, barium, bismuth, boron, cobalt, europium, gallium, germanium, gold, indium, lithium, manganese, nickel, niobium, palladium, platinum, rhodium, ruthenium, selenium, silver, tantalum, terbium, thorium, titanium, vanadium, and yttrium. Almost all electronics contain lead and tin (as solder) and copper (as wire and printed circuit board tracks), though the use of lead-free solder is now spreading rapidly. The following are ordinary applications:

Hazardous

Generally non-hazardous

Human health and safety

Residents living near recycling sites 
Residents living around the e-waste recycling sites, even if they do not involve in e-waste recycling activities, can also face the environmental exposure due to the food, water, and environmental contamination caused by e-waste, because they can easily contact to e-waste contaminated air, water, soil, dust, and food sources. In general, there are three main exposure pathways: inhalation, ingestion, and dermal contact.

Studies show that people living around e-waste recycling sites have a higher daily intake of heavy metals and a more serious body burden. Potential health risks include mental health, impaired cognitive function, and general physical health damage.(See also Electronic waste#Hazardous) DNA damage was also found more prevalent in all the e-waste exposed populations (i.e. adults, children, and neonates) than the populations in the control area. DNA breaks can increase the likelihood of wrong replication and thus mutation, as well as lead to cancer if the damage is to a tumor suppressor gene .

Prenatal exposure and neonates' health 
Prenatal exposure to e-waste has found to have adverse effects on human body burden of pollutants of the neonates. In Guiyu, one of the most famous e-waste recycling sites in China, it was found that increased cord blood lead concentration of neonates was associated with parents' participation in e-waste recycling processes, as well as how long the mothers spent living in Guiyu and in e-waste recycling factories or workshops during pregnancy. Besides, a higher placental metallothionein (a small protein marking the exposure of toxic metals) was found among neonates from Guiyu as a result of Cd exposure, while the higher Cd level in Guiyu's neonates was related to the involvement in e-waste recycling of their parents. High PFOA exposure of mothers in Guiyu is related to adverse effect on growth of their new-born and the prepotency in this area.

Prenatal exposure to informal e-waste recycling can also lead to several adverse birth outcomes (still birth, low birth weight, low Apgar scores, etc.) and longterm effects such as behavioral and learning problems of the neonates in their future life.

Children 
Children are especially sensitive to e-waste exposure because of several reasons, such as their smaller size, higher metabolism rate, larger surface area in relation to their weight, and multiple exposure pathways (for example, dermal, hand-to-mouth, and take-home exposure). They were measured to have an 8-time potential health risk compared to the adult e-waste recycling workers. Studies have found significant higher blood lead levels (BLL) and blood cadmium levels (BCL) of children living in e-waste recycling area compared to those living in control area. For example, one study found that the average BLL in Guiyu was nearly 1.5 times compared to that in the control site (15.3 ug/dL compared to 9.9 ug/dL), while the CDC of the United States has set a reference level for blood lead at 5 ug/dL. The highest concentrations of lead were found in the children of parents whose workshop dealt with circuit boards and the lowest was among those who recycled plastic.

Exposure to e-waste can cause serious health problems to children. Children's exposure to developmental neurotoxins containing in e-waste such as lead, mercury, cadmium, chromium, arsenic, nickel  and PBDEs can lead to a higher risk of lower IQ, impaired cognitive function, exposure to known human carcinogens and other adverse effects. In certain age groups, a decreased lung function of children in e-waste recycling sites has been found. Some studies also found associations between children's e-waste exposure and impaired coagulation, hearing loss, and decreased vaccine antibody tilters in e-waste recycling area. For instance, nickel exposure in boys aged 8–9 years at an e-waste site leads to lower forced vital capacity, decrease in catalase activities and significant increase in superoxide dismutase activities and malondialdehyde levels.

E-waste recycling workers 
The complex composition and improper handling of e-waste adversely affect human health. A growing body of epidemiological and clinical evidence has led to increased concern about the potential threat of e-waste to human health, especially in developing countries such as India and China. For instance, in terms of health hazards, open burning of printed wiring boards increases the concentration of dioxins in the surrounding areas. These toxins cause an increased risk of cancer if inhaled by workers and local residents. Toxic metals and poison can also enter the bloodstream during the manual extraction and collection of tiny quantities of precious metals, and workers are continuously exposed to poisonous chemicals and fumes of highly concentrated acids. Recovering resalable copper by burning insulated wires causes neurological disorders, and acute exposure to cadmium, found in semiconductors and chip resistors, can damage the kidneys and liver and cause bone loss. Long-term exposure to lead on printed circuit boards and computer and television screens can damage the central and peripheral nervous system and kidneys, and children are more susceptible to these harmful effects.

The Occupational Safety & Health Administration (OSHA) has summarized several potential safety hazards of recycling workers in general, such as crushing hazards, hazardous energy released, and toxic metals.

OSHA has also specified some chemical components of electronics that can potentially do harm to e-recycling workers' health, such as lead, mercury, PCBs, asbestos, refractory ceramic fibers (RCFs), and radioactive substances. Besides, in the United States, most of these chemical hazards have specific Occupational exposure limits (OELs) set by OSHA, National Institute for Occupational Safety and Health (NIOSH), and American Conference of Governmental Industrial Hygienists (ACGIH).

For the details of health consequences of these chemical hazards, see also Electronic waste#Electronic waste substances.

Informal and formal industries 
Informal e-recycling industry refers to small e-waste recycling workshops with few (if any) automatic procedures and personal protective equipment (PPE). On the other hand, formal e-recycling industry refers to regular e-recycling facilities sorting materials from e-waste with automatic machinery and manual labor, where pollution control and PPE are common. Sometimes formal e-recycling facilities dismantle the e-waste to sort materials, then distribute it to other downstream recycling department to further recover materials such as plastic and metals.

The health impact of e-waste recycling workers working in informal industry and formal industry are expect to be different in the extent. Studies in three recycling sites in China suggest that the health risks of workers from formal e-recycling facilities in Jiangsu and Shanghai were lower compared to those worked in informal e-recycling sites in Guiyu.  The primitive methods used by unregulated backyard operators (e.g., the informal sector) to reclaim, reprocess, and recycle e-waste materials expose the workers to a number of toxic substances. Processes such as dismantling components, wet chemical processing, and incineration are used and result in direct exposure and inhalation of harmful chemicals. Safety equipment such as gloves, face masks, and ventilation fans are virtually unknown, and workers often have little idea of what they are handling. In another study of e-waste recycling in India, hair samples were collected from workers at an e-waste recycling facility and an e-waste recycling slum community (informal industry) in Bangalore. Levels of V, Cr, Mn, Mo, Sn, Tl, and Pb were significantly higher in the workers at the e-waste recycling facility compared to the e-waste workers in the slum community. However, Co, Ag, Cd, and Hg levels were significantly higher in the slum community workers compared to the facility workers.

Even in formal e-recycling industry, workers can be exposed to excessive pollutants. Studies in the formal e-recycling facilities in France and Sweden found workers' overexposure (compared to recommended occupational guidelines) to lead, cadmium, mercury and some other metals, as well as BFRs, PCBs, dioxin and furans. Workers in formal industry are also exposed to more brominated flame-retardants than reference groups.

Hazard controls 
For occupational health and safety of e-waste recycling workers, both employers and workers should take actions. Suggestions for the e-waste facility employers and workers given by California Department of Public Health are illustrated in the graphic.

See also 

 2000s commodities boom
 Computer Recycling
 Digger gold
 eDay
 Electronic waste in Japan
 Green computing
 Mobile phone recycling
 Material safety data sheet
 Polychlorinated biphenyls
 Retrocomputing
 Radio Row

Policy and conventions:
 Basel Action Network (BAN)
 Basel Convention
 China RoHS
 e-Stewards
 Restriction of Hazardous Substances Directive (RoHS)
 Soesterberg Principles
 Sustainable Electronics Initiative (SEI)
 Waste Electrical and Electronic Equipment Directive

Organizations:
 Asset Disposal and Information Security Alliance (ADISA)
 Empa
 iFixit
 International Network for Environmental Compliance and Enforcement
 Institute of Scrap Recycling Industries (ISRI)
 Solving the E-waste Problem
 World Reuse, Repair and Recycling Association

Security:
 Data erasure

General:
 Retail hazardous waste
 Waste
 Waste management

References

Further reading 
 
 
 
 
 United Nations University: THE GLOBAL E-WASTE MONITOR 2014 – Quantities, flows and resources, 2015
 
 (13 MB PDF)

External links 

 
 Sustainable Management of Electronics
 MOOC: Massive Online Open Course "Waste Management and Critical Raw Materials" on (amongst others) recycling and reuse of electronics.

 
Occupational safety and health